The Sea Life London Aquarium is located on the ground floor of County Hall on the South Bank of the River Thames in central London, near the London Eye. It opened in March 1997 as the London Aquarium and hosts about one million visitors each year.

History

In 2005, the aquarium displayed three robotic Fish created by the computer science department at the University of Essex. The fish were designed to be autonomous, swimming around and avoiding obstacles like real fish. Their creator claimed that he was trying to combine "the speed of tuna, acceleration of a pike, and the navigating skills of an eel."

In April 2008, the aquarium was purchased by Merlin Entertainments for an undisclosed sum. The facility was closed for a £5 million refurbishment, which was completed in April 2009. The additions included a new underwater tunnel, Shark Walk, a revamped Pacific Ocean tank, and a complete rerouting of the exhibit, all of which were carried out under the supervision of architect Kay Elliott. The attraction officially became a Sea Life Centre when it reopened in April 2009.

In May 2011, the aquarium opened a new penguin exhibit, with 10 gentoo penguins transferred from the Edinburgh Zoo. In 2015, the aquarium was moved to a different location in County Hall due to the opening of Shrek's Adventure! London.

Conservation and education

The aquarium includes two classrooms themed around the conservation campaigns which the zoo supports, which host up to 40,000 school children each year and are open to the public when not in use by the education program. It is involved in several breeding programs including the Cuban crocodile, seahorses, butterfly goodeids, and jellyfish, and works with many conservation organizations including Whale and Dolphin Conservation Society, Save Our Seas, and Shark Trust.

See also
London zoo
Biota!, a proposed but since cancelled aquarium in London

References

External links 

Sea Life Centres
Tourist attractions in London
Buildings and structures in the London Borough of Lambeth
Aquaria in England
Tourist attractions in the London Borough of Lambeth